The men's pole vault event at the 1969 European Indoor Games was held on 9 March in Belgrade.

Results

References

Pole vault at the European Athletics Indoor Championships
Pole